Cochylimorpha salinarida is a species of moth of the family Tortricidae. It is found in Alicante, Spain.

The wingspan is 15–21 mm. The forewings are whitish with dark brown marking with some mixture of grey and black scales. The hindwings are whitish grey, but darker apically and with an indistinct slightly darker basal band.

Etymology
The species is named after the two possible locality types: salt marshes (salinas) and dryer rocky areas (aridas).

References

Moths described in 2003
Cochylimorpha
Moths of Europe